Bilal Husain Khan (born 12 September 1994) is an Indian professional footballer who plays as a goalkeeper for I-League club Gokulam Kerala.

Career

Churchill Brothers
He started his senior career with Churchill Brothers in 2013 and played 9 games there.

Hindustan FC
In 2014, he was signed by Hindustan FC. He made 12 appearances during the season.

Mohammedan SC
In 2016, he signed for Mohammedan. He was the second choice keeper there and made 5 appearances in total.

Pune City 
Pune City signed him on 2017. But he was loaned to Gokulam Kerala.

Gokulam Kerala (loan)
He was there first keeper choice in Gokulam Kerala and played in 13 games and was a crucial member of the team.

Real Kashmir (loan)
Bilal Khan's best performance came during the 2018–19 I-League.He played in 20 games and got 9 clean-sheets during the season. He was selected as the goalkeeper of the tournament by winning the golden glove.

Kerala Blasters
On 10 July 2019, it was announced that Bilal was signed by the Indian Super League club Kerala Blasters FC. He made his ISL debut against ATK on 20 October 2019, where Blasters won the match by 2–1. He then made another 4 appearances during the season. After making no appearance in the 2020–21 Indian Super League season, on 1 September 2021, the club announced the departure of Bilal from the club ahead of the 2021–22 Indian Super League season.

Career statistics

Club

References

External links 

1994 births
Living people
Indian footballers
I-League 2nd Division players
Association football goalkeepers
Gokulam Kerala FC players
Real Kashmir FC players
Indian Super League players
Kerala Blasters FC players
Churchill Brothers FC Goa players
Hindustan FC players
Mohammedan SC (Kolkata) players
FC Pune City players
Footballers from Uttar Pradesh